The 2007 Montana Grizzlies football team represented the University of Montana in the 2007 NCAA Division I FCS football season. The Grizzlies were led by fifth-year head coach Bobby Hauck and played their home games at Washington–Grizzly Stadium.

Schedule

Roster

References

Montana
Montana Grizzlies football seasons
Big Sky Conference football champion seasons
Montana Grizzlies football